Mary Hussey may refer to:
 Mary Inda Hussey, American Assyriologist and professor
 Mary Dudley Hussey, American lawyer, physician, and suffragist